Todd Jeremey Gilliland (born May 15, 2000) is an American professional stock car racing driver. He competes full-time in the NASCAR Cup Series, driving the No. 38/36 Ford Mustang for Front Row Motorsports and the No. 15 Mustang for Rick Ware Racing. He is the son of NASCAR driver and team owner David Gilliland.

Racing career

Early career
Gilliland first started driving when he was three years old; his parents purchased a pink (later repainted to black) Barbie corvette with modified pedals and an additional battery to increase its speed. Afterwards, he began driving a quarter midget on a neighborhood dirt track. Two years later, he started racing competitively, but stopped for two years at the decision of his father. In 2012, he won championships in the North Carolina Quarter Midget Association, USAC World Formula National Quarter Midget Championship and on the West Coast; he concluded his quarter midget career with 34 wins. The following year, he started limited late model racing, running three races. In 2014, he won his first limited late model race from the pole position at Ace Speedway. Later in the year, he won his first late model race at Southern National Motorsports Park.

2015–2017: First ARCA win and K&N West championships
On May 17, two days after his fifteenth birthday, Gilliland became the youngest driver to compete in the ARCA Racing Series when he made his debut at Toledo Speedway with Venturini Motorsports. After leading the race weekend's practice session and qualifying fifth, he held off Tom Hessert and Josh Williams to win, becoming the youngest winner in ARCA series history.

On November 12, Gilliland ran his first race in the K&N Pro Series West for Frontline Enterprises and Bill McAnally Racing at Phoenix International Raceway, taking the lead with five laps to go after J. J. Haley's tire went down and defeated William Byron on the green–white–checker finish to win. The win made Gilliland the youngest race winner in track history. In postrace inspection, Gilliland's car was found to have the lubrication oil reservoir tank cover bolted improperly. As a result, his team received a P5 penalty (the second-worst in NASCAR) and was docked thirty points, although Gilliland was allowed to keep the victory. On January 29, 2016, Gilliland joined Kyle Busch Motorsports' Super Late Model team.

On February 4, 2016, McAnally announced that Gilliland would compete full-time in the series, driving the No. 16 Toyota Camry. Gilliland also made a start in the K&N Pro Series East at New Smyrna Speedway. After winning the pole, he won the race in controversial fashion, as Ronnie Bassett Jr. was originally declared the winner since the flagman failed to wave the white flag in time after lap 150 and unintentionally extended the race by a lap. The race was subsequently declared official after 150 laps. On March 19, 2016, Gilliland went on to win his second Pro Series West race and his third Pro Touring series race at Irwindale Speedway. After winning at Kern County Raceway Park, the victory marked his fourth K&N Series win in four starts, tying the record set by Dan Gurney 50 years earlier. In May, he was named a member of the 2016–17 NASCAR Next program. Gilliland clinched the Pro Series West championship on October 15.

In December 2016, Gilliland signed with Kyle Busch Motorsports to run four Camping World Truck Series races in the No. 51 Toyota Tundra in 2017. In May 2017, KBM announced plans for Gilliland to make his Truck Series debut at Dover International Speedway in the No. 46 truck, followed by stints in the No. 51 at Gateway Motorsports Park, Canadian Tire Motorsports Park and New Hampshire Motor Speedway before returning to the No. 46 at Martinsville Speedway. On November 4, Gilliland won the Pro Series West championship for the second consecutive season. For his final Truck race of the year, he would drive the No. 51 at Phoenix International Raceway.

2018–2021: Truck Series full-time

On January 17, 2018, KBM announced that Gilliland would compete for NASCAR Camping World Truck Series Rookie of the Year in 2018, driving the No. 4 Toyota Tundra beginning at Martinsville Speedway, and most of the races following that. The series did grant Gilliland a waiver to become eligible for the NASCAR playoffs with a win, as drivers usually have to start every race to make the playoffs. Gilliland started the 2018 season by holding off Harrison Burton to win the K&N Pro Series East season opener at New Smyrna Speedway, leading the most laps and winning on a last lap pass. He also won the second K&N East race of the season, triumphing at Bristol Motor Speedway for his 20th overall win in K&N Pro Series competition, also having won races in the NASCAR K&N Pro Series West.

On October 25, 2019, Gilliland won his first career Truck Series race at Martinsville Speedway.

On January 13, 2020, Front Row Motorsports announced that Gilliland would drive the newly opened No. 38 Ford F-150 for the full 2020 Truck season. Gilliland recorded ten top-ten finishes and four top fives to qualify for the playoffs.

Gilliland returned to the No. 38 in 2021. Todd Gilliland won his second career Truck series at Circuit of the Americas, his first win for Front Row Motorsports. With his win at COTA, Gilliland qualified for the playoffs and was eliminated after the Round of 10.

2022–present: Move to Cup Series

On November 30, 2021, Front Row Motorsports announced that Gilliland would move to the No. 38 Cup Series ride and compete for NASCAR Rookie of the Year. His first Cup Series race was at the 2022 Daytona 500. Gilliland started 29th and finished 33rd after being eliminated in an incident on lap 190. On December 15, 2022, Gilliland returned to the No. 38 car for his second full-time in the Cup Series with new crew chief Ryan Bergenty. However, on February 7, Gilliland was demoted to a part-time ride since Zane Smith will be in the No. 38 car for six races. However, Gilliland will pilot the No. 15 for Rick Ware Racing in five races. On March 2, Front Row Motorsports announced that Gilliland will race at Talladega in the No. 36 to complete his full season.

Personal life
Gilliland's father David competed in the NASCAR Cup Series. His grandfather Butch, the 1997 NASCAR Winston West Series champion, formerly competed in the Cup and Truck Series.

Motorsports career results

NASCAR
(key) (Bold – Pole position awarded by qualifying time. Italics – Pole position earned by points standings or practice time. * – Most laps led.)

Cup Series

Daytona 500

Camping World Truck Series

 Season in progress
 Ineligible for series points

K&N Pro Series East

ARCA Menards Series
(key) (Bold – Pole position awarded by qualifying time. Italics – Pole position earned by points standings or practice time. * – Most laps led.)

ARCA Menards Series West

References

External links

 
 

Living people
2000 births
ARCA Menards Series drivers
NASCAR drivers
Racing drivers from North Carolina
People from Sherrills Ford, North Carolina
Kyle Busch Motorsports drivers
Joe Gibbs Racing drivers